A Girl Named Tamiko is a 1962 romantic drama film directed by John Sturges and starring Laurence Harvey and France Nuyen, with Martha Hyer, Gary Merrill, Michael Wilding, and Miyoshi Umeki. It is based on the novel of the same name by Ronald Kirkbride.

A Girl Named Tamiko was filmed on-location in Japan in Technicolor and Panavision, and released by Paramount Pictures.

Plot
Ivan Kalin (Laurence Harvey) is a Eurasian photographer who is trapped in Japan, but who wants to emigrate to the United States.

His visa is continually delayed, which causes him to use his charm with women to pull some strings and apply some pressure on the embassy. His romantic magnetism works on a thrill-seeking American (Martha Hyer) and an aristocratic Japanese woman (France Nuyen).

Cast
Laurence Harvey - Ivan Kalin 
France Nuyen - Tamiko 
Martha Hyer - Fay Wilson 
Gary Merrill - Max Wilson 
Michael Wilding - Nigel Costairs 
Miyoshi Umeki - Eiko

Release
The film had its world premiere at the Palace Theatre in Honolulu on December 27, 1962.

See also
 List of American films of 1962

References

External links

 

1962 films
1962 drama films
American drama films
1960s English-language films
Films scored by Elmer Bernstein
Films based on Canadian novels
Films directed by John Sturges
Films produced by Hal B. Wallis
Films set in Japan
Paramount Pictures films
Films with screenplays by Edward Anhalt
Japan in non-Japanese culture
1960s American films